Engin Alan (born 31 March 1945 in Istanbul) is a former Turkish general. He was Chief of the Special Forces of the Turkish Army from 1996 to 2000. He retired in 2005.

After his retirement he became General Director of the Foundation to Strengthen the Turkish Armed Forces (TSKGV), and was later charged in the Sledgehammer coup plan trials, relating to an alleged 2003 plot. In the 2011 Turkish general election he was elected to the Grand National Assembly of Turkey representing Istanbul for the Nationalist Movement Party. A court ruled against releasing Alan so that he could take up his seat.

In 2012 he was sentenced to 18 years for his role in the Sledgehammer coup plan, and later detained in connection with the 1997 "post-modern coup". He remained an MP while the case was under appeal.

References

1945 births
Living people
Turkish Army generals
Special Warfare Department personnel
Nationalist Movement Party politicians
Deputies of Istanbul
Prisoners and detainees of Turkey
Members of the 24th Parliament of Turkey
Turkish military personnel of the Cyprus conflicts